Martin L. Shoemaker is an American computer programmer and science fiction author, active in the field since 2011.

Biography
Shoemaker is the third of four children of John and Dawn Shoemaker from Byron Center. A lifelong resident of West Michigan, he lived in Monterey Township in 2015. He was educated at Byron Center High School, the University of Michigan and Grand Valley State University. He attributes his love of reading and, creative urge and work ethic to his parents, and his interest in science fiction as his "genre of choice" to Star Trek and the televised Apollo moon landings. Shoemaker has described himself as "a programmer who writes on the side." 
A second place win in the Jim Baen Memorial Writing Contest rewarded him with a lunch with astronaut Buzz Aldrin.

Literary career
Shoemaker's work has appeared in various periodicals, webzines, podcasts and anthologies, including Analog Science Fiction/Science Fact, The Best Science Fiction of the Year: Volume One, Clarkesworld, Digital Science Fiction, Forever Magazine, Galaxy's Edge, The Glass Parachute, Humanity 2.0, Little Green Men: Attack!, Nebula Awards Showcase 2017, Time Travel Tales, Trajectories, Writers of the Future Volume 31, The Year's Best Science Fiction: Thirty-First Annual Collection, The Year's Best Science Fiction: Thirty-Third Annual Collection, The Year's Best Science Fiction and Fantasy 2016, Year's Top Short SF Novels 4, and The Year's Top Ten Tales of Science Fiction 8.

Bibliography

Novels
Today I Am Carey (2019)
The Last Dance (Near-Earth Mysteries 1, 2019)
The Last Campaign (Near-Earth Mysteries 2, 2020)

Short fiction 
Collections
Family Secrets (2017)
Blue collar space (2018)
HMI : Human-Machine Interface (2019)
Stories

Nonfiction
"Jack McDevitt, History Builder" (2018)

Awards
"Scramble" won second place in the Jim Baen Memorial Writing Contest. "Murder on the Aldrin Express" placed second in the 2013 Analog Analytical Laboratory Award for Best Novella. "Not Close Enough" placed second in the 2013 Analog Analytical Laboratory Award for Best Novelette. Unrefined took third place in the Writers of the Future contest, 2014.  "Racing to Mars" won the Analog Analytical Laboratory Award for Best Novelette. "Today I Am Paul" won the Washington Science Fiction Society's Small Press Award, was nominated for the 2016 Nebula Award for Best Short Story, and placed 22nd in the 2016 Locus Award for Best Short Story. "Not Far Enough" placed fifth in the 2017 Analog Analytical Laboratory Award for Best Novella.

References

Further reading

External links 
 

Living people
21st-century American male writers
American speculative fiction writers
Analog Science Fiction and Fact people
Year of birth missing (living people)